Yana Wachuku (Quechua yana black, Ancash Quechua wachuku big belt, girdle, "black belt" or "black girdle", Hispanicized spelling Yanahuachuco) is a  mountain in the Andes of Peru. It is located in the Junín Region, Yauli Province, on the border of the districts of Carhuacayan and Marcapomacocha. It lies southeast of Allqay.

References

Mountains of Peru
Mountains of Junín Region